Danny Hudson (born 25 June 1979) is an English footballer who played in The Football League for Rotherham United. He also played non-League football for Doncaster Rovers, Halifax Town and Belper Town.
He retired from football to pursue a career as a prison officer.

References

External links

People from Mexborough
Footballers from Doncaster
English footballers
Rotherham United F.C. players
Doncaster Rovers F.C. players
Halifax Town A.F.C. players
Belper Town F.C. players
English Football League players
1979 births
Living people
Association football midfielders